Tamagotchi: Party On!, known in Japan as Tamagotchi's Sparkling President, is a video game in the Tamagotchi series for the Wii. The game was released in the United States on May 29, 2007 by Namco Bandai Games. In Japan, the game was released as a launch title. It is the only Tamagotchi Wii game released outside Japan.

Gameplay
Like the other Tamagotchi games, Tamagotchi: Party On! is composed of mini-games in which players compete. The game's mini-games, like Driving and Watering plants, have rewards at the end depending on how well the mini-game was cleared. Players play as different Tamagotchi characters like Mimitchi, Violetchi, Kuchipatchi, etc. It also has games in which the player tries to get "Gotchi", Tamagotchi cash. Players use this cash to buy items to customize their headquarters. Players can play as the Tamagotchi characters, such as Mametchi and Kuchipatchi, with some characters unlocked while playing. There are always four players in the game. If there are fewer than four people playing, the CPU will play. The player can set the difficulty level to easy, medium, or hard. The game is a series of elections, set by the player, that determine who will be the next president of Tamaworld. Apart from this, the player can also play the minigames separately.

Story
It is time for a new president of Tamaworld, and the Tamagotchi are setting up an election to see who it will be. The planet is abuzz and some of the characters want to be president. The election managers hold a competition for whoever can do the most good deeds, become the most popular Tamagotchi on the planet and get the most votes. The Tamagotchis set off to become the most popular Tama on the planet and the title of president.

References

External links
Tamagotchi: Party On! at IGN
Meida Wii entry

2006 video games
Bandai Namco games
H.a.n.d. games
Multiplayer and single-player video games
Party video games
Tamagotchi video games
Video games based on toys
Video games developed in Japan
Wii games
Wii-only games